Sunlands is a locality on the left bank of the Murray River,  west of Waikerie, South Australia. The Waikerie Golf and Country Club course is in Sunlands.

The current boundaries of Sunlands were set in September 2000 for the long established name. They include the Sunlands South and Sunlands North irrigation areas. Most of the irrigated areas of Sunlands are planted with citrus orchards.

Qualco lies on the inside of a bend in the river. Sunlands has a short river frontage at the upstream (eastern) end of Qualco, downstream of Ramco. Sunlands extends almost to the river at the northern end of Qualco, bounded by the Cadell Valley Road, in the vicinity of the area known as Oxford Landing.

Oxford Landing Estates is a major wine producer in the area.

The 2016 Australian census which was conducted in August 2016 reports that Sunlands had a population of 376 people.

Sunlands is located within the federal division of Barker, the state Electoral district of Chaffey and the local government area of the District Council of Loxton Waikerie.

See also
Ramco Point Conservation Park

References

Riverland